Seltjarnarnes is a town in the Capital Region of Iceland. Seltjarnarnes is adjacent to Reykjavik.

It took on its current political form shortly after the Second World War and was formally created as a township in 1947. It is the smallest Icelandic township by land.

Overview

There are two schools in Seltjarnarnes, Mýrarhúsaskóli and Valhúsaskóli.

The Independence Party has had an overall control in the town's council since proper elections started in 1962. First Lady of Iceland Guðrún Katrín Þorbergsdóttir held a position in the city council for 16 years. In the last elections in 2014, the party received 52,6% of the votes and 4 out of 7 members of the council. Other parties represented in the town council are Samfylkingin with 2 members and Neslistinn with one member. The mayor is Ásgerður Halldórsdóttir.

Seltjarnarnes became the world's first town where every citizen had access to fiber optics in 2007.

Sports
The local football team Grótta play in Iceland's first level division. Grótta's handball teams play in Iceland's top division. Grótta's women's team were Icelandic champions in 2015 and 2016. Grótta also has gymnastics and weight-lifting.

Notable people
 Jon von Tetzchner, founder of Opera and Vivaldi web browsers.

Twin towns – sister cities

Seltjarnarnes is twinned with:
 Lieto, Finland
 Nesodden, Norway
 Herlev, Denmark
 Höganäs, Sweden

References

External links

Official website 

Municipalities of Iceland
Populated places in Capital Region (Iceland)
Populated places established in 1947
Peninsulas of Iceland
1947 establishments in Iceland